Uchtspringe is a village and a former municipality in the district of Stendal, in Saxony-Anhalt, Germany.

Since 1 January 2010, Uchtspringe is part of the town Stendal.

References

Former municipalities in Saxony-Anhalt
Stendal